Richard Lussick (born 1940) is a Samoan judge. Lussick was the presiding judge in the trial of Charles Taylor by the Special Court for Sierra Leone; in May 2012, he sentenced Taylor to 50 years in prison.

Lussick was born in Sydney, Australia in 1940. Lussick is the current and sixth President of the United Nations Appeals Tribunal. He is also a judge of the Residual Special Court for Sierra Leone. Justice Lussick served as a judge of the Special Court for Sierra Leone from November 2004 to May 2012, finishing his tenure as Presiding Judge of Trial Chamber II. From 2005 to 2006 he also sat as the Staff Appeals Judge for the Special Court.

From 1995 to 2000, he served as the Chief Justice of the Republic of Kiribati. Prior to that he was appointed to the bench in Samoa in 1987 and during his tenure held appointments to the District Court, Supreme Court, Court of Appeal, Land and Titles Court and as Acting Chief Justice. He also served as Chairman of the Public Service Board of Appeal from 1988 to 1995. He was Vice President of the Commonwealth Magistrates’ and Judges’ Association (Pacific Region) from 1997 to 2000. He was called to the Bar in 1973 and has practiced as a barrister in both Samoa and Australia. He is fluent in English and has a basic knowledge of French.

References

External links
Smh.com.au

1940 births
Living people
People from Sydney
Samoan judges
Special Court for Sierra Leone judges
Samoan judges on the courts of Kiribati
Samoan judges of United Nations courts and tribunals